Hummelo en Keppel is a former municipality in the Dutch province of Gelderland. It was created in 1818, when the municipalities of Hummelo and Keppel merged, and existed until 2005, when the area became a part of the new municipality of Bronckhorst.

References

Municipalities of the Netherlands disestablished in 2005
Former municipalities of Gelderland
Bronckhorst